Sumaterana crassiovis is a species of true frog. It is endemic to Sumatra, Indonesia. It is also known as the Bander Baru frog, Korinchi frog, and Kerinci cascade frog.

It can occur in slightly disturbed forest habitats and agroforestry areas. The tadpoles use their ventral suckers to cling on rocks in fast-moving streams.

References

crassiovis
Amphibians of Indonesia
Endemic fauna of Sumatra
Amphibians described in 1920
Taxa named by George Albert Boulenger
Taxobox binomials not recognized by IUCN